Daskaleia, is an uninhabited Greek islet, in the Aegean Sea, close to the northeastern coast of Crete. The small islet lies close to the island of Kyriamadi. Administratively it lies within the Itanos municipality of Lasithi.

See also
List of islands of Greece

References 

Landforms of Lasithi
Uninhabited islands of Crete
Islands of Greece